John Robert Prendergast (born 1930/1931 - died September 4, 2016) is a former Canadian football player who played for the Calgary Stampeders.

He played three plus years with Calgary Stampeders followed by 40 years in the aviation industry including airborne geophysics, arctic exploration and heliskiing.

References

1930s births
Date of birth missing
2016 deaths
Canadian football offensive linemen
Calgary Stampeders players
Canadian Roman Catholics